Saint-Bonnet-de-Chirac is a commune in the Lozère department in southern France.

Geography
The Colagne forms part of the commune's south-western border, then flows into the Lot, which forms part of the commune's southern border.

See also
Communes of the Lozère department

References

Saintbonnetdechirac